The Lone Star Expo Center is a 5,000-seat multi-purpose arena in Conroe, Texas, USA. It hosts local sporting events, concerts, and other events.  It was opened in 2002.  In 2007, it became home to the now-defunct Conroe Storm indoor football team.

External links
Lone Star Expo Center Home Page

Sports venues in Texas
Indoor arenas in Texas
American football venues in Texas
Conroe, Texas